Cathy A. Cowan, an economist, works for the National Health Statistics Group with the Office of the Actuary at the Centers for Medicare & Medicaid Services (CMS). For 25 years, she investigated the historical state-based and national estimations of capital spent on health care within the United States. Cowan specializes in health financing, private health insurance, out of pocket spending and the health costs of businesses, households and the government. Similarly, she enjoys looking into comparing the health expenditure data with the household surveys along with international comparisons. Her education was expanded upon with a bachelor's degree in business at Indiana University and a master's degree in the University of South Carolina. In one particular study, Cathy A. Cowan, who was working as a business analyst at Health Care Financing Administration, concluded that the government and businesses each paid about a third of health care costs throughout the 1980s, along with an equal share from patients. During a news conference, the economist claimed that the national growth of health-care spending was slightly faster in 2006 than 2005 due to a 6.7 percent increase from a 6.5 percent growth. In fact, in 2006, expenditures reached $2.1 trillion, which is similar to $7000 a person in the United States. As a part of the World Health Organization, she was selected as the chair of the Global Health Expenditure Database's Technical Advisory Group. Cowan's fame was expanded when she was recognized as one of the world's most influential scientific minds. Some of her well known works include “National Health Expenditures, “Business, Households and Government: Health Care Spending”, “Burden of Health Care Costs”, “Reconciling Medical Expenditure Estimates from the MEPS and NHE”, and “Out-of-pocket health care expenditures, by insurance status, 2007-10”.

Selected works

References 

></ref>

 Her research focuses on health care expenditure in the United States, comparing the trends of government, business and personal spending patterns.  Besides issuing quarterly and annual reviews of the costs of health care,

External links 
 Publications list

Living people
Indiana University alumni
University of South Carolina alumni
Women statisticians
American women economists
Health economists
21st-century American economists
Year of birth missing (living people)
21st-century American women